Pseudotritonia gracilidens is a species of sea slug, a dorid nudibranch, a shell-less marine gastropod mollusk in the family Curnonidae.

Distribution
Pseudotritonia gracilidens is found along the Atlantic sector of the Antarctic coast and islands and in the Southern Ocean.

References

Charcotiidae
Gastropods described in 1944